Oliver Carmichael (October 3, 1891 – September 25, 1966) served as the third chancellor of Vanderbilt University from 1937 to 1946. He also served as the President of the University of Alabama from 1953 to 1957.

Early life
Oliver Cromwell Carmichael was born on October 3, 1891, the son of a farmer. He received a B.A. from Alabama Presbyterian College and an M.A. from the University of Alabama. He was a Rhodes Scholar at Oxford University, following Harvie Branscomb (1894–1998).  He was the first Rhodes Scholar from Alabama.

Career
Carmichael worked in a YMCA in India and East Africa. During the First World War, Carmichael and later Vanderbilt Chancellor Harvie Branscomb worked for the American Commission for Relief in Belgium under Herbert Hoover. He joined the British Army in 1915 and served in the East African campaign and commanded a field canteen. He returned to the United States but then joined the United States Army shortly after the American entry into World War I, serving as a first lieutenant with the 321st Regiment of the 81st Division on the Western Front from August 1918 onwards.

After the war, Belgium awarded Carmichael and Branscomb the Médaille du Roi Albert and Médaille de la Reine Élisabeth for their service. On his return, he became a high school principal. From 1926 to 1935, Carmichael served as the fourth president of Alabama College, now known as the University of Montevallo.

Carmichael became Dean of the Graduate School of Vanderbilt University in Nashville, Tennessee in 1935, and he was elevated to serve as the third chancellor of the University from 1937 to 1946. In 1939, he was also elected to the board of trustees of Duke University.

Carmichael served as the President of the Carnegie Foundation for the Advancement of Teaching from 1945 to 1953. During his tenure, he wrote an article entitled What Makes a Good College President.

Carmichael served as the President of the University of Alabama from 1953 to 1957. During his tenure, the football team lost consistently. He resigned over a "violent controversy" after expelling Autherine Lucy, an African-American student. While he broadly hinted that UA might have to comply with the U.S. Supreme Court's decision against segregation, the board of trustees did not agree. He ultimately resigned over the issue.

Death
Carmichael died on September 25, 1966.

Legacy
Carmichael Towers (1970–2019 and 1966–2021) on the campus of Vanderbilt University were four residential buildings named in his honor.

The campus library at the University of Montevallo, on Bloch Street, completed in 1968, bears Carmichael's name.

Bibliography

References

1891 births
1966 deaths
Military personnel from Alabama
British Army personnel of World War I
United States Army personnel of World War I
British Army officers
United States Army officers
University of Alabama alumni
American Rhodes Scholars
Chancellors of Vanderbilt University
University of Montevallo people
Presidents of the University of Alabama
Duke University trustees